The Absentee   (Spanish language:El Ausente) is a 1989  Argentine film directed and written by Rafael Filipelli. The film starred Verónica Castro, Daniel Greco and Ana María Mazza

Plot
Raúl Salas is the general secretary of a major union in Córdoba, Argentina.

Cast
 Ricardo Bertone
 Verónica Castro Julia
 Alejandro Cuevas
 Daniel Greco ....  Lencinas
 Hugo Guzzo
 Miguel Angel Iriarte
 Ana María Mazza ....  Elena
 Pepe Novoa
 Omar Rezk ....  Raúl Salas
 Beatriz Sarlo
 Andrés Silvart
 Roberto Suter ....  Muñiz
 Omar Viale ....  Rios

Release
The film premiered in 1989.

External links
 

1989 films
1980s Spanish-language films
1989 crime drama films
Argentine drama films
1980s Argentine films